The Southern snipe eel (Avocettina acuticeps) is an eel in the family Nemichthyidae (snipe eels). It was described by Charles Tate Regan in 1916, originally under the genus Leptocephalus. It is a marine, deep water-dwelling eel which is known from throughout the southern regions of the ocean, with the exception of the eastern Pacific.

The Southern snipe eel is not of commercial interest to fisheries.

References

Nemichthyidae
Fish described in 1916